

Births and deaths

Births
 Francis O'Neill (1848–1936) Irish collector of tunes
 John J. Kimmel (1866–1942) Irish musician
 Elizabeth Cronin (1879–1956) Irish folk singer
 Michael Coleman (1891–1945) Irish fiddler
 James Morrison (1893–1947) Irish fiddler

Collections of songs or music
 1796 "General Collection of the Ancient Music of Ireland" by Edward Bunting (1773–1843)
 1800 "Collection of National Irish Music for the Union Pipes" by O'Farrell
 1831 "Irish Minstrelsy" by James Hardiman
 1840s, 1850s  "Manuscript Collection" by Canon James Goodman
 1855 "Music of Ireland" by George Petrie

See also
List of Irish music collectors

1500s